Pola Sieverding (born 1981) is a German photographer and video artist. She works in the field of lens based media.

Education 
Sieverding graduated in 2007 with an MFA from the Berlin University of the Arts where she studied under Stan Douglas, Ellen Cantor, Dieter Appelt, Sabeth Buchmann, and Katja Diefenbach. In 2002, she attended the Carnegie Mellon University in Pittsburgh, Pennsylvania and in 2005 the Surikov Art Institute in Moscow.

Work 
The artist's work questions traditional concepts of gender, culture, and normality; capturing both specific social spaces and the unique people who live in them. Sieverding's work primarily analyses the relationship between her subjects- individuals who range from women in traditional Islamic dress to drag queens, performance actors and the Berlin club scene- to their bodies. In recent years the artist has added to her work the depiction of equally unique architecture which is portrayed as means of being a specific social space. Continuously throughout the artist's work, materiality plays a significant role: be it elements of concrete and glass in Close to Concrete I and II, hair in To The Crowned And Conquering Child or textiles as in the photo series Text I-VI. In cooperation with Orson Sieverding, the artist develops electronic soundscapes for her installations which when projected onto her protagonists transform into urban echoes.

Grants 
Sieverding has won an art grant from the Senate of Berlin twice, in 2008 and 2014. In 2011 Sieverding was invited as an artist in residence at the Meet Factory in Prague, the Maumaus in Lisbon, and as a visiting lecturer at the International Art Academy in Ramallah, Palestine where she received an art grant from the Anna Lindh Foundation. Today the artist resides and works in Berlin.

Major solo exhibitions 
2018/2019: "Bodies that matter", knustxkunz+, München
2018: "Gustav Peichl - 15 Bauten zum 90sten", MAK – Österreichisches Museum für angewandte Kunst / Gegenwartskunst, Wien
2016: "THE EPIC", NAK Neuer Aachener Kunstverein, Aachen
 2015: "ARENA", at Anna Jill Lüpertz Gallery, Berlin
 2014: "GRANDS ENSEMBLES" at BOX21 Freiraum für Kultur, Berlin
 2012: "CROSS METROPOLIS MACHINE/CLOSE TO CONCRETE" at BRAENNEN, Berlin
 2012 "CROSS METROPOLIS MACHINE" at Galerie Kostka, Prague
 2011: "CLOSE TO CONCRETE" at Lumiar Cité, Lisbon
 2010: "Never mind about the six feet, let's talk about the seven inches" at Galerie Lena Brüning, Berlin
 2010: "RHIZOMA" at TÄT, Berlin
 2009/2010: "Figures of Affect" Friederike Hamann and Pola Sieverding, Galerie Campagne Première, Berlin
 2009: "Cadavre Exquis" at Galerie Lena Brüning, Berlin

Major group exhibitions 
 2016: "Von den Strömen der Stadt", Museum Abteiberg, Mönhengladbach
 2016: "The Self. Perception  – Profession  – Portrait", Dubai Photo Exhibition, Dubai kuratiert von Frank Wagner und Zelda Cheatle
 2014: "LOVE AIDS RIOT SEX 2" at Neue Gesellschaft für Bildende Kunst, Berlin
 2014: "Blended Generations" at 701 e.V., Düsseldorf 2014
 2014: "The Undulation of Something Faintly Familiar" at Anat Ebgi Gallery, Los Angeles
 2013: "BERLIN.STATUS [2]" at Künstlerhaus Bethanien, Berlin
 2013: "040 Festival für Fotografie in der Gegenwartskunst – Destroyed Images" at Frappant, Hamburg
 2012: "Hyperrealz" at Bruno Glint, London
 2011: "Hot Spot Berlin" at Georg Kolbe Museum, Berlin
 2011: "Alive She Cried" curated by Reynold Reynolds at Galerie Zink, Berlin
 2010: "Künstler der Galerie III" at Galerie Lena Brüning, Berlin
 2010: "Six Days of New Media" at Linienstraße 127, Berlin
 2010: "No more daughters and heroes" at Aram Art Gallery, Goyang Cultural Foundation, Seoul
 2009: "Künstler der Galerie II" at Galerie Lena Brüning, Berlin
 2007: "Hardcore Glamour" at Kunstraum Kreuzberg/ Bethanien, Berlin

Major collaborations and performances 
 2014: "Kunsthalle Bühne: Das Fest! VERSION featuring ORSON&POLA", Orson Sieverding and Pola Sieverding at Kunstverein, Düsseldorf
 2012: " https://web.archive.org/web/20141219114212/http://pfad.d13.documenta.de/ " Natascha Sadr Haghighian collaborating with Pola Sieverding at dOCUMENTA (13), Kassel

Publications 
 2018: THE EPIC, Hrsg. NAK Neuer Aachener Kunstverein, Verlag Hatje Cantz
2016: Berlin Raum Radar edited by Nadine Barth, Verlag Hatje Cantz
 2016: Dubai Photo Exhibition, edited by Zelda Cheatle
 2015: trail, edited by Natascha Sadr Haghighian, Pola Sieverding, Jasper Kettner; Schriftenreihe des documenta Archivs. Verlag Spector Books, Leipzig
 2015: History is a Warm Gun, edited by Britta Schmitz, n.b.k. Berlin, Verlag Walter König
 2015: ARENA, exhibition catalogue by Anna Jill Lüpertz Gallery, Berlin
 2014: LOVE AIDS RIOT SEX, edited by Frank Wagner, nGbK, Berlin
 2013: Artists for Revival – Rehberger, Morris, Brandenburg, Sieverding, Bonvicini, Yalcindag, Schulze, Sweeny, Zipp, Nickolson, edited by Schiesser
 2013: Berlin.Status(2) – 50 Positionen junger Künstler und Künstlerinnen aus Berlin, edited by Sven Drühl, Christoph Tannert, Künstlerhaus Bethanien
 2012: https://web.archive.org/web/20141219114212/http://pfad.d13.documenta.de/, Natascha Sadr Haghighian & Pola Sieverding at dOCUMENTA (13)
 2010: Never Mind About The Six Feet. Let's Talk About The Seven Inches, exhibition catalogue by Galeria Lena Brüning, Berlin
 2010: TEXT Revue, edited by Andrea van Dühren, Berlin
 2009: WOUND: Creative Culture Close Up, Pola Sieverding: Now Objectivity by Ken Pratt, London, UK, Fall Issue
 2008: Spex, Nr. 312, White Cube Ambition-Junge Berliner Künstler, Liebling Nr. 05, Special Issue
 2004: Klinik unter Palmen-Statements aus der Kunstakademie, in Texte zur Kunst "Erziehung" Issue 53

References

External links
 About the Seven Inches by Marc Siegel

1981 births
Living people
21st-century German photographers
German women photographers
German video artists
Berlin University of the Arts alumni
Women video artists
21st-century German women artists
Carnegie Mellon University alumni
Photographers from Berlin
21st-century women photographers